Alexander Stephen Hassell (born 7 September 1980) is an English actor, and co-founder of The Factory Theatre Company. He has played roles on screen in Bonkers (2007), Suburbicon and The Miniaturist (2017), Genius (2018), The Boys (2019), Cowboy Bebop (2021), and His Dark Materials (2022).

Early life and education
Hassell was born in Southend, England, the youngest of four, to a vicar. After completing his education at Moulsham High School, in Chelmsford, Essex, he studied acting for a further two and a half years at the Central School of Speech and Drama.

Career 
He has appeared in a number of stage roles, most recently as Hal in Henry IV Parts I and II, and Henry in Henry V, for the Royal Shakespeare Company. He is co-founder of The Factory Theatre Company whose patrons include Ewan McGregor, Bill Nighy, Mark Rylance and Emma Thompson.
 
His debut television appearance was in 2001, in an episode of Queen of Swords. His first Hollywood role was in George Clooney's Suburbicon (2017), in a cast which included Matt Damon and Julianne Moore. and later that year he appeared in his first major television role in the BBC adaptation of Jessie Burton's The Miniaturist, alongside Anya Taylor-Joy, which first aired on Boxing Day 2017. 

In 2019, He appeared as Translucent in the first season of The Boys (2019) on Amazon Prime Video, and played Vicious in Netflix's Cowboy Bebop in 2021., and portrayed Metatron in the final season of the BBC/HBO fantasy series His Dark Materials.

Filmography

Film

Television

References

External links

1980 births
British male film actors
British male television actors
Living people
People from Southend-on-Sea
Male actors from Essex
21st-century British male actors